This page lists the winners and nominees for the Soul Train Music Award for Best Gospel Album – Solo. The award was only given out during the first two ceremonies, before being retired in 1989.

Winners and nominees
Winners are listed first and highlighted in bold.

1980s

See also
 Soul Train Music Award for Best Gospel Album
 Soul Train Music Award for Best Gospel Album – Group or Band

References

Soul Train Music Awards
Awards established in 1987
Awards disestablished in 1988
Album awards